The Molander Case is a 1945 German drama film directed by Georg Wilhelm Pabst. The movie is based on the novel Die Sternegeige by Alfred Karrasch. On August 28, 1944, Pabst started shooting the movie for Terra Film. As shooting was just completing at the Barrandov Studios in Prague, and the process of editing begun, Prague was invaded by the Soviets and Pabst was forced to abandon the work. The remaining film is kept at the Národní Filmový Archiv (NFA) in Prague.

Plot
The young violinist Fritz Molander inherited a Stradivarius, the so-called “star violin”, from his father, a famous conductor. Molander junior has a lot of talent and has already made it to the first violinist in the State Opera. But he wants more. His goal is great fame as his father, who died early, had once achieved. For since his death the family has been in considerable economic difficulties and has to restrict itself. Fritz absolutely wants to change this situation. To make matters worse, Molander's concert agency demands a considerable advance payment, which he can only pay if he sells the precious star violin. After selling the Stradivarius, Molander can finally give unlimited concerts and is celebrated by both critics and audiences. But suddenly the police arrested him: It had been established that the alleged Stradivarius was a fake!

Elisabeth Molander, the artist's sister, then goes to her secret fiancé, the young public prosecutor Holk, who is working on the "Molander case". While she offers Holk to break off the engagement because of this "scandal", he wants to resign from this case as a public prosecutor in order not to get into a conflict of interest. Elisabeth then turns to her fiancé's father, the old Attorney General Holk. He then decides to handle the case himself. His research finally shows that the old instrument maker Dannemann had exchanged the star violin for a worthless but not immediately recognizable fake during a repair. For him, it was not about the money, but, as an obsessed instrument lover, about the large piece of violin making culture.

Fritz Molander is released from prison and rehabilitated. Old Holk also ensures that his son and fiancée can now get together again, officially appear as a couple and finally get married. While Elisabeth can finally introduce her fiancé to her mother, the sounds coaxed from the Stradivarius by Fritz Molander ring out the open window.

Cast 
 Paul Wegener as Holk, Prosecutor General
 Irene von Meyendorff as Elisabeth Molander
 Werner Hinz as Holk, Prosecutor
 Erich Ponto as Dannemann
 Eva Maria Meineke
 Robert Tessen as Fritz Molander
 Harald Paulsen
 Elisabeth Markus as Frau Molander
 Otto Wernicke as Kunsthändler

References

External links

1945 films
Films of Nazi Germany
1940s German-language films
1945 drama films
German black-and-white films
Films directed by G. W. Pabst
1940s unfinished films
German drama films
1940s German films